Rock FM 91.9 is a music radio station serving the north of Johannesburg. Rock FM is operated under a low power commercial FM license from ICASA.

The signal has an average range of 5–10 km, covering the areas: Northriding, Johannesburg North, Sundowner, Boskruin, Randpark Ridge, Fourways and Randburg.

The power output (ERP) of Rock FM's signal is 1 Watt.

Coverage Areas
Randburg
Fourways
Northriding
Kyalami

Broadcast Languages
English

Broadcast Time
24/7

Target Audience
LSM Groups 8 – 10
Age Group 20 - 38
Middle to upper-middle class

Programme Format
70% Music
30% Talk

Listenership Figures

References

External links 
http://www.rockfm.co.za
SAARF Website
Sentech Website

Radio stations in Johannesburg